Solidago bicolor, with several common names including white goldenrod, silverrod and (in Québec) verge d’or bicolore, is a plant species native to much of eastern North America. It is found in Canada (from Manitoba to Nova Scotia) and in the United States (every state completely east of the Mississippi except Florida). It prefers sandy and rocky soils, and can frequently be found along roadsides.

Solidago bicolor is distinctive in the genus. Stems are thin and wiry. Flowers are white rather than yellow, the heads mostly clustered in the axils of the leaves rather than displayed in a large terminal raceme.

References

bicolor
Flora of the United States
Flora of Canada
Plants described in 1767
Taxa named by Carl Linnaeus